= Huguenot Farms, Virginia =

Unincorporated community in Virginia, US

Coordinates: 37°33′15″N 77°35′04″W

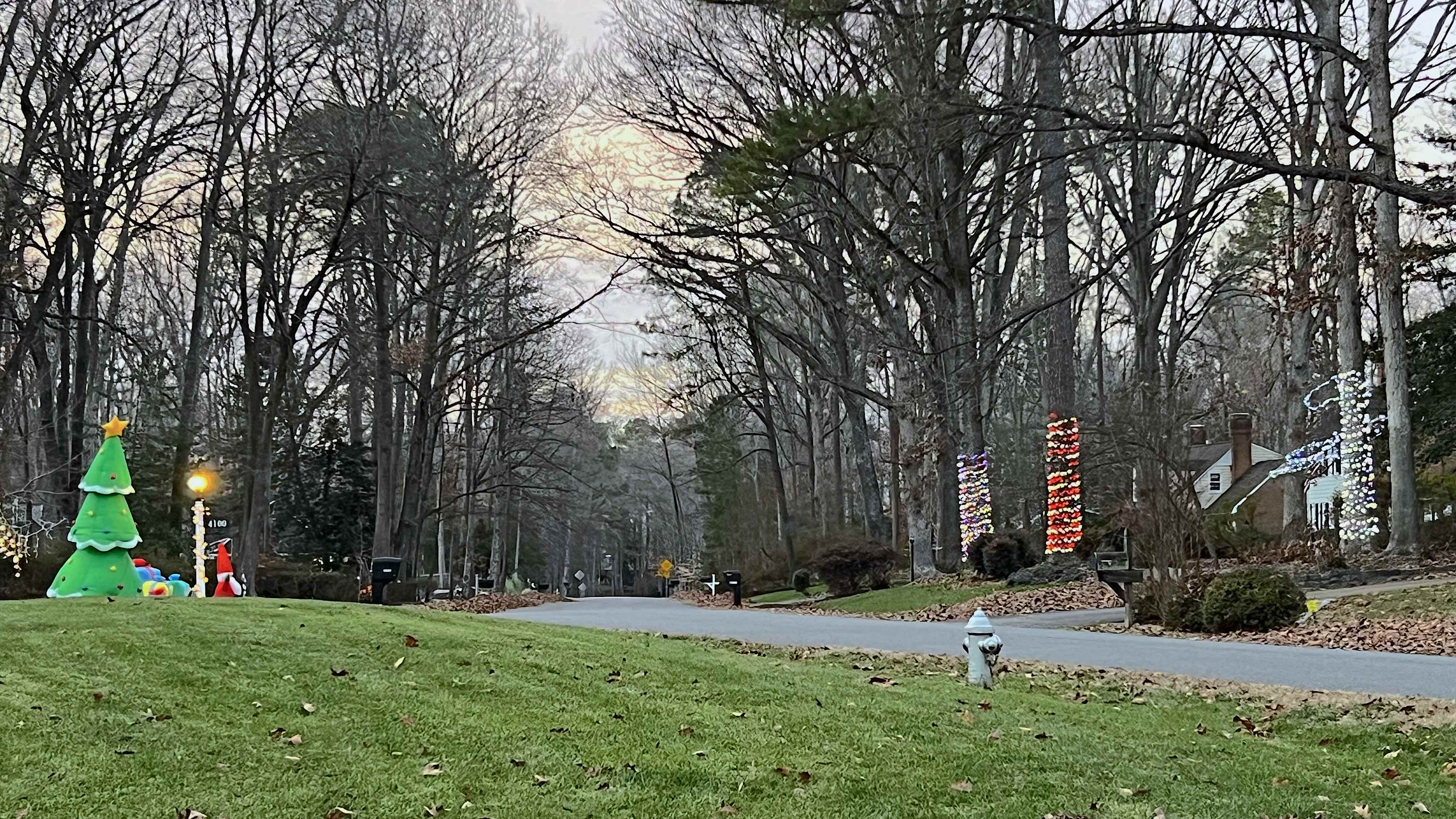
Huguenot Farms subdivision, 2023.

Huguenot Farms is an unincorporated community in the city of Richmond, in the U.S. state of Virginia.
